The 1962–63 Montreal Canadiens season was the 54th season in franchise history. The team placed third in the regular season to qualify for the playoffs. The Canadiens were eliminated in semi-finals by the Toronto Maple Leafs 4 games to 1.

Regular season

Final standings

Record vs. opponents

Schedule and results

Playoffs

Semi-finals

Player statistics

Regular season
Scoring

Goaltending

Playoffs
Scoring

Goaltending

Awards and records

Transactions

See also
 1962–63 NHL season

References

External links
Canadiens on Hockey Database
Canadiens on NHL Reference

Montreal Canadiens seasons
Mon
Mon
1960s in Montreal
1962 in Quebec
1963 in Quebec